Thienemann is a surname. Notable people with the surname include:

August Thienemann (1882–1960), German limnologist, zoologist and ecologist
Johannes Thienemann (1863–1938), German ornithologist
Ludwig Thienemann (1793–1858), German physician and naturalist
Otto Thienemann (late 19th c.), Austrian architect. Modified Lutheran City Church and designed the Thienemannhof and Café Museum buildings in Vienna